Marco Falcone (born 19 February 1959) is an Italian fencer. He competed in the individual épée event at the 1980 Summer Olympics.

References

1959 births
Living people
Italian male fencers
Olympic fencers of Italy
Fencers at the 1980 Summer Olympics